is a Japanese diplomat and Japan's current ambassador to The Netherlands, after a previous mission in Pakistan.

Overview 

Inomata graduated from Waseda University in 1978 and started his professional career the same year. In 2010, he served as Consul-General of Japan at San Francisco.

References

Living people
1954 births
Waseda University alumni
Ambassadors of Japan to the Netherlands